Jadav is a caste of India who are classified as an Other Backwards Class in the country's system of positive discrimination. They have a presence in the states of Gujarat and Rajasthan.

The Jadav claim to a Rajput heritage, and thus to be kshatriya in the traditional varna ritual ranking system of Hinduism, is rejected by most other Rajput communities. Their endogamy, which is commonly thought to be an implicit feature of Indian castes, is a recent development, according to Ghanshyam Shah; they previously practised hypergamy by marrying their women with Rajputs.

See also
Kunbi, another caste that includes a group called the Jadhav
Jatav

References
Citations

Bibliography

History of Gujarat
Rajput clans of Gujarat

Further reading

Social groups of Gujarat
Social groups of Rajasthan